Braydon Preuss (born 16 June 1995) is a professional Australian rules footballer playing for the Greater Western Sydney Giants in the Australian Football League (AFL).

Early life
Preuss was born and raised in Townsville, Queensland. He played rugby league until the age of 16 when friends convinced him to try Australian rules football. He began playing his junior football for Hermit Park in the local AFL Townsville competition before relocating to the Gold Coast and playing for Surfers Paradise in an attempt to increase his chances of being drafted. He was a member of the Gold Coast Suns academy.

AFL career
He was drafted by North Melbourne with their first selection and fifteenth overall in the 2015 rookie draft. He made his AFL debut in the forty-three point loss against  in the opening round of the 2017 season at the Etihad Stadium.

He was traded to the Giants on 10 November for Pick 31.

Statistics
Statistics are correct to the end of 2020

|- 
! scope="row" style="text-align:center" | 2016
|
| 31 || 0 || — || — || — || — || — || — || — || — || — || — || — || — || — || — || — || —
|- style="background-color: #EAEAEA"
! scope="row" style="text-align:center" | 2017
|
| 31 || 8 || 5 || 6 || 42 || 29 || 71 || 29 || 23 || 180 || 0.6 || 0.8 || 5.3 || 3.6 || 8.9 || 3.6 || 2.9 || 22.5
|- 
! scope="row" style="text-align:center" | 2018
|
| 31 || 0 || — || — || — || — || — || — || — || — || — || — || — || — || — || — || — || —
|- style="background-color: #EAEAEA"
! scope="row" style="text-align:center" | 2019
|
| 21 || 7 || 4 || 2 || 49 || 17 || 66 || 15 || 7 || 133 || 0.6 || 0.3 || 7.0 || 2.4 || 9.4 || 2.1 || 1.0 || 19.0
|- 
! scope="row" style="text-align:center" | 2020
|
| 21 || 3 || — || — || 16 || 6 || 22 || 7 || — || — || — || — || — || — || — || — || — || —
|- class="sortbottom"
! colspan=3| Career
! 18
! 9
! 8
! 107
! 52
! 159
! 51
! 30
! 313
! 0.6
! 0.5
! 6.1
! 3.1
! 9.1
! 2.9
! 2.0
! 20.9
|}

References

External links

1995 births
Living people
North Melbourne Football Club players
Sportspeople from Townsville
Australian rules footballers from Queensland
Melbourne Football Club players
Greater Western Sydney Giants players